Mike McGinness is a Republican member of the Nevada Senate, representing the Central Nevada District (map) since 1993. Previously he served in the Nevada Assembly from 1989 through 1991.  Senator McGinness was elected by his caucus to serve as the Minority Floor Leader in November, 2010.

External links
Nevada State Legislature - Senator Mike McGinness official government website
Project Vote Smart - Senator Mike McGinness (NV) profile
Follow the Money - Mike McGinness
2006 2004 2000 1996 1992 1990 campaign contributions

1947 births
Living people
People from Fallon, Nevada
University of Nevada, Reno alumni
Republican Party members of the Nevada Assembly
Republican Party Nevada state senators